Pearls III (Close to the Edge) is an album by Elkie Brooks.

Issued on CD, vinyl and cassette in 1991 through Freestyle Records, the album failed to enter the UK charts after a difficult distribution deal stalled.

Track listing 
"The Last Teardrop" (Steve Thompson)
"Don't Go Changing Your Mind" (Brooks, Andrew Murray, Brendon Taylor)
"We Are All Your Children" (Brooks, Trevor Jordan)
"One of a Kind" (Steve Thompson, Tommy Morrison)
"Tell Her" (Brooks)
"You and I (Are You Lonely)" (Brooks) 
"Free to Love" (Brooks, Gary Hutchins)
"Suits My Style" (Brooks)
"Got to Get Better" (Brooks)
"From the Heart" (Brooks)

Single releases 
"The Last Teardrop" (1991)
"One of a Kind" (1991, Belgium only)

Personnel 
Elkie Brooks – vocals
Andrew Murray – piano, keyboards
Trevor Jordan – piano, keyboards, producer, engineer
Paul Dunn – guitars
Brendon Taylor – bass guitar, drums

References

1991 albums
Elkie Brooks albums